Darren Dunning (born 8 January 1981) is an English former professional footballer who played as a midfielder.

Having come through the youth academy at Blackburn Rovers he spent time on loan with Brisol City, Rochdale, Blackpool, Torquay United and Macclesfield Town. He notably spent three seasons with York City and later had spells with Harrogate Town and Gainsborough Trinity.

Career
Born in Scarborough, North Yorkshire, Dunning grew up in the village of Welburn before attending Malton School. He began his career as a trainee with the Blackburn Rovers youth system, turning professional in February 1999. He joined Bristol City on loan in August 2000, making his league debut for the Robins on 12 August 2000, in a 2–0 win away to Wrexham. He played nine times for City before returning to Blackburn that October.

His Blackburn debut came on 31 October 2000, Dunning playing all of the 2–0 League Cup defeat away to West Ham United. He also played one FA Cup match and one league match for Blackburn before the end of the 2000–01 season.

He scored his first and only Blackburn goal in a 2–0 win over Oldham in the League Cup. He joined Rochdale on loan in November 2001 and moved to Blackpool on loan in March 2002, making just one first team appearance for Blackburn, in the League Cup that season. In November 2002, Dunning joined Torquay United on loan, scoring the first league goal of his career in the 3–1 win at home to Southend United, having replaced the injured Martin Gritton in the 5th minute of the game. In January 2003, he moved to Macclesfield Town on loan until the end of the season, when he was released by Blackburn.

In July 2003 he signed for York City and was a regular in the York side relegated to the Conference National at the end of the season. He remained with York until June 2006, when he left after rejecting a new contract with the club. The following month, he joined Conference North team Harrogate Town, teaming-up with his twin brother, Richard, and former York teammates Jamie Price and Dave Merris. He made his debut in a 1–0 victory against Moor Green and scored his first goal as Harrogate defeated Barrow 3–2. Dunning finished his first season, 2006–07, by starting in all of Harrogate's 48 games, as well as scoring five goals. He signed a new contract with the club in June 2008. He joined fellow Conference North team Gainsborough Trinity in May 2009. Dunning retired in 2010 due to knee ligament damage.

Personal life
As of 2019, Dunning resides in York, runs his own plumbing company and has coached a successful local amateur football team.

References

External links

1981 births
Living people
Sportspeople from Scarborough, North Yorkshire
English footballers
Association football midfielders
Blackburn Rovers F.C. players
Bristol City F.C. players
Rochdale A.F.C. players
Blackpool F.C. players
Torquay United F.C. players
Macclesfield Town F.C. players
York City F.C. players
Harrogate Town A.F.C. players
Gainsborough Trinity F.C. players
English Football League players
National League (English football) players
Footballers from North Yorkshire